De Vitre, De Vitré or Devitre  may refer to 

 Edward Denis de Vitre (1806-1878), English physician
 François Martin de Vitré (17th century), French sailor and adventurer
 Ayesha Devitre, screenwriter of 2012 film Ek Main Aur Ekk Tu
 Mark DeVitre, executive vice-president of Entertainment Studios

Places connected with the city of Vitré, France
Château de Vitré, castle
Gare de Vitré, railway station